Dobrovolsky is a rural locality (a settlement) in Aleksandrovsky Selsoviet, Suyetsky District, Altai Krai, Russia. The population was 10 as of 2013. There is 1 street.

Geography 
Dobrovolsky is located 19 km southeast of Verkh-Suyetka (the district's administrative centre) by road. Aleksandrovka and Ukrainsky are the nearest rural localities.

References 

Rural localities in Suyetsky District